Alicia Cebrián Martínez de Lagos (born 3 February 1983 in Santa Cruz de Tenerife) is a Spanish Real Club Náutico de Tenerife sailor. She competed in the Laser Radial class event at the 2012 Summer Olympics, where she placed 11th.

References

External links
 

1983 births
Living people
Spanish female sailors (sport)
Olympic sailors of Spain
Sailors at the 2012 Summer Olympics – Laser Radial
Sportspeople from Santa Cruz de Tenerife
Sailors at the 2016 Summer Olympics – Laser Radial
Mediterranean Games silver medalists for Spain
Competitors at the 2013 Mediterranean Games
Mediterranean Games medalists in sailing